Hydrelia' flavidula is a moth in the family Geometridae first described by William Warren in 1907. It is found in Papua New Guinea.

Adults are sexually dimorphic.

Taxonomy
The species does not actually belong in the genus Hydrelia, or even the tribe Asthenini, but has not been reassigned to another genus yet.

References

Moths described in 1907
Asthenini
Moths of New Guinea